is a 1936 Japanese film directed by Yasujirō Ozu, starring Chōko Iida and Shin'ichi Himori.  The film was Ozu's first "talkie" (sound film) feature.

Plot

The film starts in the rural town of Shinshū in 1923. A widow, Tsune (O-Tsune) Nonomiya (Chōko Iida), works hard at a silk production factory to provide for her only son, Ryōsuke. When Ryōsuke's teacher Ōkubo (Chishū Ryū) persuades her to let her son continue to study beyond elementary school, she decides to support her son's education even until college despite her poverty. Her son promises to become a great man.

Thirteen years later, in 1936, O-Tsune visits Ryōsuke (Shin'ichi Himori) in Tokyo. She learns that her son, now a night school teacher, has married and has a son. Her daughter-in-law Sugiko is nice and obliging, but Ryōsuke's job does not pay much. Ryosuke and O-Tsune visit Ōkubo, who is now a father of four and running a tonkatsu restaurant.

The couple keeps the mother entertained but their money is running out. On a trip to an industrial district one day, Ryōsuke confides in his mother that he wishes he had never come to Tokyo because it's difficult to succeed there, and that he is a disappointment to his mother. O-Tsune chides her son for giving up, telling him she has given up everything to see him succeed.

Sugiko sells her kimono and raises enough money for the whole family to go out to enjoy themselves. However Tomibo (Tomio Aoki), a neighbor's son, gets injured by a horse and Ryōsuke rushes him to the hospital. There he gives their money to Tomibo's mother to pay the hospital bill. O-Tsune later praises Ryōsuke for his selfless act.

O-Tsune eventually returns to Shinshu, but not before giving the couple some money for her grandson. Ryōsuke promises his wife he will obtain a teaching certificate. Back at Shinshū, O-Tsune tells her friend at the factory her son has become a "great man". But as she retires to the back of the factory after work, her face breaks into an expression of deep grief and pain.

Cast
Choko Iida as Tsune Nonomiya
Himori Shin'ichi as her son, Ryosuke
Masao Hayama as young Ryosuke
Yoshiko Tsubouchi as Sugiko
Chishū Ryū as Okubo-sensei, Ryosuke's teacher
Tomoko Naniwa as Okubo's wife
Bakudan Kozo (Jun Yokoyama) as their son
Mitsuko Yoshikawa as Otaka, Ryosuke's neighbour
Tokkan Kozo (Tomio Aoki) as her son, Tomibo
Eiko Takamatsu as Oshige

Reception
Roger Ebert inducted The Only Son into his Great Movies section, writing of its direction, "I really do feel as if Ozu is looking at his films along with me. He isn't throwing them up on the screen for me to see by myself. Together we look at people trying to please, and often failing, and sometimes redeeming." Richard Brody of The New Yorker argued, "Ozu watches with his own stifled fury, as modernity uproots both the best and the worst aspects of tradition."

DVD release
In 2010, the BFI released a Region 2 DVD of the film as a bonus feature on its Dual Format Edition (Blu-ray + DVD) of Late Spring.

References

External links

Senses of cinema article by James Leahy on the film
The Only Son: Japan, 1936 an essay by Tony Rayns at the Criterion Collection

1936 drama films
1936 films
Films about educators
Films directed by Yasujirō Ozu
Films set in Tokyo
Films with screenplays by Tadao Ikeda
Japanese black-and-white films
Japanese drama films
1930s Japanese-language films
Films about mother–son relationships
Shochiku films